Mondlo is a township in Zululand District Municipality in the KwaZulu-Natal province of South Africa.

References

Populated places in the Abaqulusi Local Municipality